Oliver Benjamin Laxton (born 29 June 1999) is a former Hong Kong professional footballer of English descent who played as a defensive midfielder.

International career
Having lived in Hong Kong for many years, Laxton had acquired a HKSAR passport in 2020 that made him become eligible to represent the national team. He was selected for Hong Kong U-23 for the 2022 AFC U-23 Asian Cup qualification qualifiers where he made his debut against Cambodia U-23.

Career statistics

Club

Notes

References

Living people
1999 births
Hong Kong people of English descent
Hong Kong footballers
English footballers
Association football defenders
Association football midfielders
Hong Kong First Division League players
Hong Kong Premier League players
Hong Kong FC players
Eastern Sports Club footballers
Sham Shui Po SA players